Alessio Perilli was an Italian motorcycle road racer. He was killed in a crash during a European Superstock Championship race at TT Circuit Assen on 5 September 2004. He was 20. He scored 4 points in the season, reaching the 30th final position.

References

1983 births
Sportspeople from Rome
2004 deaths
Italian motorcycle racers
Motorcycle racers who died while racing